Number 7 is an album by the American urban contemporary gospel group Commissioned, released in 1991 on Benson Records.

At the time of the album's release, Commissioned's line-up included four of its six original members (Fred Hammond, Mitchell Jones, Mike Williams and Karl Reid) along with newer members Marvin Sapp, Maxx Frank and Eddie Howard.

Track listing 
 "Second Chance" – 5:37
 "Love U With the Rest of My Life" – 5:51
 "We Are Overcomers" – 5:40
 "I Really Love the Lord (Interlude)" – 0:51
 "Hold Me" – 5:56
 "King of Glory" – 5:57
 "Please You More" – 6:29
 "Be an Example" – 5:23
 "I Can't Live Without U" – 4:34
 "Secret Place" – 4:15
 "I Really Love the Lord" – 2:42
 "I Love Thinking of U" – 4:39
 "Please You More [instrumental]" – 6:26

Chart positions

Album

Personnel
Fred Hammond: vocals, bass, keyboards, drum programming, drums
Mitchell Jones: vocals, keyboards, drum machine, drum programming
Marvin Sapp: vocals
Karl Reid: vocals
Maxx Frank: keyboards, piano, strings overdub
Michael Williams: drums, drum programming, drum overdubs, cymbals
Eddie Howard, Jr.: keyboards, bass, synthesizer bass

Additional Musicians
Transformation Crusade: rap on "King of Glory"
Randy Poole: Keyboard programming
Paul "PDA" Allen: keyboard programming
Valdez Brantley: drum programming, keyboards, programming
Skip Pruitt: saxophone
Bernard Wright: drum programming, keyboards, key bass, keyboard bass
Dave Ward: drum programming, keyboard programming
Anson Dawkins: drum programming, drums, programming
Eric Dawkins: keyboards

References

Commissioned (gospel group) albums
1991 albums